Amniscites pictipes is a species of beetle in the family Cerambycidae, the only species in the genus Amniscites.

References

Acanthocinini